The Book of Proper Names is a Belgian novel by Amélie Nothomb. It was first published in 2002.  It is a romanticized account of the life of the singer RoBERT, whom Nothomb became acquainted with as an avid admirer of her songs.

Plot
In a vaguely surreal story, an extraordinary little girl is born from strange circumstances - her mother murdered her father, gave birth in prison, and then hanged herself. Plectrude, as the girl is unfortunately named by her mother, is adopted by her aunt and lives a fairy-like existence until she enrolls into the Paris Opera Ballet School, a rigorous institution portrayed as a "scalpel to slice away the last flesh of childhood."

References

External links 
 Oxford Index - Anna Kemp, French Studies, "The Child as Artist in Amélie Nothomb's "Robert des noms propres"

2002 Belgian novels
French-language novels
Novels by Amélie Nothomb
Éditions Albin Michel books